The SNEB rocket is an unguided air-to-ground  rocket projectile manufactured by the French company TDA Armements, designed for launch by combat aircraft and helicopters. It is also known as the SNEB rocket pod, and sometimes as the Matra rocket, due to its commonly being carried in pod-like launchers built by Matra.

The 37mm caliber was one of the earliest folding fin free flight rockets developed after World War II; it was developed mainly for air-to-air engagements and is no longer in service. The 100mm caliber variant is in service with the French Air Force and a few other air forces. Besides France, several other nations produce the SNEB 68 mm rocket under license. In France today, SNEB has been reorganized into the firm of Thomson-Brandt.

Warheads

The SNEB rocket projectiles can be armed with the following warheads:
High explosive
High explosive anti-tank warhead
Multi-purpose fragmentation
Flechette anti-personnel/materiel
Smoke
Illuminating
Training rocket

Laser guidance development
The Systeme de Roquette A Corrections de Trajectoire (SYROCOT) is a program where a laser-guided seeker is incorporated into the design. It is compatible with the existing SNEB system. It is comparable to the US Advanced Precision Kill Weapon System project.

Rocket launchers/pods
The French armament company of Matra produced the following types of rocket launcher for use with the SNEB 68 mm rocket projectiles:

Matra Type 116M rocket launcher — This was lightly constructed and is used as an expendable rocket launcher pod with a frangible nose cone, loaded with 19 SNEB 68mm rockets which were fired in a single rippled 0.5 second salvo with a time interval of 33 milliseconds between each rocket firing. The pod is automatically jettisoned after all the rockets are expended.

Matra Type 155 rocket launcher — Widely produced, this was a reusable device manufactured completely from metal with a fluted nose cone through which the rocket projectiles were fired. Loaded with 18 SNEB 68mm rockets, it can be pre-programmed on the ground to fire in shots or in one single ripple salvo as the Type 116M.
Matra JL-100 drop tank/rocket pack — This unique arrangement combines a  drop tank with a rocket launcher containing 19 SNEB 68 mm rockets in front to form an aerodynamically-shaped pod which can be mounted on over-wing or under-wing hardpoints. One notable aircraft equipped with this was the English Electric Lightning F.53 of Royal Saudi Air Force.

TDA Armements SAS (a subsidiary of Thales Group) also manufactures pods for the 68mm SNEB rocket. Variants produced are the 12 tube Telson 12 JF for fighter aircraft, the 12 tube Telson 12 and the 22 tube Telson 22 used by the Eurocopter Tiger, the 8 tube Telson 8 designed for light helicopters and the 2 tube Telson 2 suitable for unmanned aerial vehicles and light counter-insurgency aircraft.

The British firm Thomas French & Sons also produced a series of launchers for the SNEB, which were licensed versions of the Matra Type 155. These were later adapted for the Royal Navy's own post-war 2-inch rockets which replaced the SNEB due to concerns over the electrical firing system being set off by ship radars.

Used by

Helicopters

Fixed-wing aircraft

See also
Hydra 70, American equivalent
CRV7, Canadian equivalent
Forges de Zeebrugge, Belgian equivalent

References

External links
T.D.A. Armements SAS website
Jane's info on TDA SNEB 68 mm rockets
Jane's info on Matra rocket launchers

Air-to-ground rockets
Cold War weapons of France
Matra